The MusiCares Person of the Year is an award presented annually by MusiCares, the charity arm of The Recording Academy, the same organization that distributes the Grammy Awards, to commend musicians for their artistic achievement in the music industry and dedication to philanthropy. The award's name reflects the non-profit health care organization known as MusiCares, established by the academy "to provide health and medical assistance to needy musicians". Chosen by the MusiCares Foundation, award recipients are honored during "Grammy week" (a string of galas just prior to the annual Grammy Awards ceremony) with an "all-star" tribute concert that helps to raise money for the foundation. The award was not presented in 2021.

From 1991 to 1993, the first three MusiCares Person of the Year awards were presented to American musicians David Crosby, Bonnie Raitt, and Natalie Cole. Cuban American singer Gloria Estefan received the award in 1994, followed by Americans Tony Bennett and Quincy Jones. Between 1997 and 2004, the award went to British musicians Phil Collins, Sir Elton John, and Sting, Italian operatic tenor Luciano Pavarotti, American musicians Stevie Wonder, Paul Simon, and Billy Joel, and Irish musician Bono. 2018 honorees Fleetwood Mac became the first group to receive the award. Dolly Parton is the first country artist to receive the honor, in 2019. In 2020, the group Aerosmith was honored.

Recipients

 Each year is linked to an article about the Annual Grammy Awards ceremony of that year.

See also
 Latin Recording Academy Person of the Year
 List of Grammy Award categories
 List of humanitarian and service awards

References

External links
 Grammy Awards official website
 MusiCares feature in L.A. Times

1991 establishments in the United States
Awards established in 1991
Humanitarian and service awards
Tribute concerts in the United States